Jay Stuart Bell (born December 11, 1965) is an American former Major League Baseball shortstop and former manager of the Rocket City Trash Pandas of the Southern League. He played for the Cleveland Indians (1986–88), Pittsburgh Pirates (1989–96), Kansas City Royals (1997), Arizona Diamondbacks (1998–2002) and New York Mets (2003). He was the bench coach for the Cincinnati Reds, and was the bench coach for the New Zealand national baseball team that competed in the 2013 World Baseball Classic.

Career
Bell played his high school baseball at J.M. Tate High School, located in Cantonment, Florida. A first-round pick of the Minnesota Twins in 1984, Bell made 129 errors over his first three minor-league seasons. The following year he was traded to the Cleveland Indians in a deal that brought starter Bert Blyleven to the Twins. When he finally reached the majors in 1986, he faced Blyleven in his first major-league at-bat. During this moment, Bell ripped the first pitch he saw from Blyleven for a home run.

Bell maintained his reputation as one of the best shortstops in the 1990s. His range was only average but he had a great knowledge of the hitters and positioned himself well. He won a Gold Glove Award in 1993, breaking a string of thirteen straight National League Gold Gloves at shortstop by Ozzie Smith. It was also the first Gold Glove by a Pirate shortstop since Gene Alley's back-to-back honors in 1966 and 1967. Though mostly a singles and doubles hitter at first, Bell was also an expert at bunting. Bell did show early signs of his power potential hitting 21 home runs in 1997 and 20 in 1998. A trial switch to second base at end of the '98 season became a permanent move the next spring. Bell belted 36 of his 38 homers from his new position, a total exceeded only by Rogers Hornsby, Davey Johnson and Ryne Sandberg among second basemen. One of those round-trippers was a sixth-inning grand slam off the Oakland Athletics pitcher Jimmy Haynes on the final game before the All-Star break, which won $1 million for an Arizona fan, Gylene Hoyle, who had correctly predicted the batter and the inning for a bases-loaded blast. In his career, Bell batted .265, with 195 home runs, 868 runs batted in, 1,123 runs scored, 1,964 hits, 394 doubles, 67 triples and 91 stolen bases. As a player, Bell was well known for wearing eyeglasses on the field.

Coaching career
After the  season, Bell retired as bench coach of the Arizona Diamondbacks in order to spend more time with his family, who are located in Phoenix, Arizona and Tampa, Florida. He currently has a ballfield named after him in Phoenix, called Jay Bell Field. He became eligible for the National Baseball Hall of Fame in 2009. 75% of the vote was necessary for induction, and 5% was necessary to stay on the ballot. He received 0.4% of the vote and dropped off the ballot.

Currently, Bell serves as a member of the advisory board of the Baseball Assistance Team, a 501(c)(3) non-profit organization dedicated to helping former Major League, Minor League, and Negro league players through financial and medical difficulties.  In 2012, he served as the hitting coach for the Mobile BayBears, the Double-A affiliate of the Diamondbacks. Bell was hired as the hitting coach for the Pittsburgh Pirates on October 31, 2012. On November 11, 2013, Bell was named bench coach of the Cincinnati Reds. On October 22, 2015, it was announced that the Reds would not renew Bell's contract. On January 13, 2017, Bell became the manager for the Class A (Advanced) Tampa Yankees.

On August 29, 2017, Bell became the manager of the Scottsdale Scorpions of the Arizona Fall League. On January 25, 2018, Bell was named the manager of the Trenton Thunder, the New York Yankees AA affiliate and in 2019 he was promoted to manager of the Scranton/Wilkes-Barre RailRiders, the Yankees AAA affiliate. On January 6, 2020, Bell was announced as the manager of the Rocket City Trash Pandas, the Double-A affiliate of the Los Angeles Angels, for their inaugural season. Rocket City took the place of the relocated Mobile BayBears. He left following the 2021 season.

See also
 List of Major League Baseball career runs scored leaders
 List of Major League Baseball players with a home run in their first major league at bat

References

External links

The 100 Greatest Royals of All-Time- #100 Jay Bell
How A Career Ends: Jay Bell Homered Off A Hall Of Famer In His First At-Bat, Flied Out In His Last

1965 births
Living people
Arizona Diamondbacks coaches
Arizona Diamondbacks players
Baseball players from Florida
Buffalo Bisons (minor league) players
Cincinnati Reds coaches
Cleveland Indians players
Colorado Springs Sky Sox players
Elizabethton Twins players
Gold Glove Award winners
Kansas City Royals players
Lancaster JetHawks players
Major League Baseball bench coaches
Major League Baseball shortstops
National League All-Stars
New York Mets players
People from Pensacola, Florida
Pittsburgh Pirates coaches
Pittsburgh Pirates players
Silver Slugger Award winners
Trenton Thunder managers
Tucson Sidewinders players
Visalia Oaks players
Waterbury Indians players